Jabez Evans (29 April 1895 – 1966) was a Welsh professional footballer who played as an outside left. He made appearances in the English Football League for Tranmere Rovers. He also played for Welsh clubs Buckley United, Wrexham and Mold Town.

References

1895 births
1966 deaths
People from Buckley, Flintshire
Sportspeople from Flintshire
Welsh footballers
Association football midfielders
English Football League players
Wrexham A.F.C. players
Tranmere Rovers F.C. players